Josh Alan Friedman is an American musician, writer, editor and journalist, who has worked in New York and Dallas. He is known for his 1986 collection Tales of Times Square and his comics collaborations with his brother, artist Drew Friedman. Many of these are compiled in the books Any Similarity to Persons Living or Dead is Purely Coincidental and Warts and All. Friedman is also a musician and songwriter, recording and performing under the name Josh Alan.

Music career

Though Friedman began playing guitar at 9, a pitching injury at 14 cost him the use of his right arm for two years. "I figured if I ever had the honor of being able to play again, no one's going to pull me away from it." His time as a student with journeyman jazz guitarist Joe Monk in particular left a deep impression on the young musician.

Friedman spent his last five years in New York working as a guitarist with the busy show band City Limits, featuring Richard Lanham, former vocalist for The Drifters.

Following his move to Dallas in 1987, Friedman began recording and performing as a solo artist in earnest. He also recorded and performed extensively with Sara Hickman, and produced Dallas' KERA 90.1 Sound Sessions. Billed as "Josh Alan," he barnstormed the state of Texas for 20 years, rocking whole arenas with his Guild D-40 and earning three Dallas Observer Music Awards for Best Acoustic Act. He was noted for his live use of acoustic feedback, the Maestro Echoplex and surf instrumentals, as well as an acoustic medley of Black exploitation movie soundtracks. He has released four albums: Famous & Poor, The Worst! (a musical based on the life and career of "Worst Director of All Time" Ed Wood), Blacks 'n' Jews (the title of which was also used for a documentary on Friedman's life) and Josh Alan Band.

Josh Alan has recorded and/or played with Sara Hickman, Keb' Mo', Kinky Friedman, Bugs Henderson, Phoebe Legere, and was a perennial opener in Texas for dozens of rock and blues acts, including Johnny Winter, Clarence "Gatemouth" Brown, War, Huey Lewis and the News, Bad Company, Mitch Ryder, Michael Nesmith and Wanda Jackson.

Writing career

Friedman's first published work was for Screw magazine. He continued to write for the magazine for several years, eventually holding the position of Senior Editor through 1982. He covered the Times Square beat for Screw during a perilous time when few, if any writers, ventured there. He also worked as a producer on Screw'''s cable television show, Midnight Blue. Several of Friedman's Screw pieces would eventually serve as the foundation for his 1986 collection, Tales of Times Square, documenting "pre-Disney" Times Square. By the late 70s, Josh's brother, artist Drew Friedman, was drawing covers for Screw, some conceptualized with Josh. Additionally, "Meeting Groucho," Friedman's childhood reminiscence of a memorable dinner with comedian Groucho Marx, was published in New York Magazine as "A Memory of Groucho" in August 1978.

Concurrently, Friedman worked as a stringer for Soho News, contributing celebrity profiles, notably of legendary songwriter Doc Pomus. Pomus became a friend and mentor, and Friedman credits Pomus with teaching him to be a songwriter “without him knowing it. Just by hanging around him, I felt like he taught me how to write songs…that's what turned me from being a frustrated songwriter into a songwriter.”

During this period, Friedman's comix collaborations with brother Drew were gaining momentum. Beginning with a notorious parody of The Andy Griffith Show, first published in School of Visual Arts instructor Harvey Kurtzman's student publication, Kar-tunz' (later reprinted in RAW magazine), the Friedmans developed an enthusiastic following for their bizarro parodies and dissections of forgotten B-list entertainers and obscure pop culture figures. With their acidic, occasionally fantastical biographies of second- and third-tier celebrities, such as talk show host Joe Franklin ("The Joe Franklin Story," High Times, June 1981), Wayne Newton ("The Living History of Wayne Newton," High Times, September 1983), Frank Sinatra, Jr. ("The Saga of Frank Sinatra, Jr.," National Lampoon, October 1985) and Joey Heatherton ("I, Joey Heatherton," National Lampoon, December 1989), the Friedman Bros. became the most-feared names in satirical cartooning. Their comics had a discernible influence on SCTV.

Much of their work as a team was collected in the books Any Similarity to Persons Living or Dead is Purely Coincidental (1985) and Warts and All (1990). Warts and All included an effusive introduction by Kurt Vonnegut, and the book won a comics industry Harvey Award in 1991.

Friedman served as Managing Editor of High Times magazine in 1983, and as Contributing Editor to National Lampoon in the 1980s.

In 2001, Josh co-edited Now Dig This: The Unspeakable Writings of Terry Southern in collaboration with Nile Southern.

In 2005, Feral House published When Sex Was Dirty.In 2006, I, Goldstein: My Screwed Life (with Al Goldstein) was released by Thunder's Mouth Press.

In 2007, Feral House reissued Tales of Times Square in an expanded edition.

In 2008, Tell the Truth Until They Bleed: Coming Clean in the Dirty World of Blues and Rock 'n' Roll was published by Backbeat Books. The book's opening section, a profile of songwriter Jerry Leiber, evolved from an ill-fated collaboration between Friedman and Leiber on Leiber's autobiography.  Friedman later eulogized Leiber in "Kiss My Big Black Ass: Jerry Leiber's Life in Spades" on his website. A slightly abbreviated version appeared in the Dallas Observer.

In 2009, Friedman launched Black Cracker Online, a website and online archive. Reprints, photographs, video, unpublished material and new work are posted weekly. In 2010, his autobiographical novel Black Cracker was published by Wyatt Doyle Books.

In 2012, Fantagraphics Books reprinted Any Similarity to Persons Living or Dead is Purely Coincidental, including new material from both Friedmans unique to that edition.

Also in 2012, New Texture announced the anthology Weasels Ripped My Flesh! Friedman is a contributor and co-editor, in collaboration with Robert Deis and Wyatt Doyle.

Selected bibliography

Non-fiction
 Tell the Truth Until They Bleed. New York: Backbeat Books/Hal Leonard, 2008.
 I, Goldstein (with Al Goldstein). New York: Thunder's Mouth Press, 2006.
 When Sex Was Dirty. Los Angeles: Feral House, 2005.
 Tales of Times Square. New York: Delacorte Press, 1986.

Fiction
 Weasels Ripped My Flesh! (co-editor with Robert Deis and Wyatt Doyle). Los Angeles: New Texture, 2012.
 Black Cracker: An Autobiographical Novel. Los Angeles: Wyatt Doyle Books/New Texture, 2010.
 Now Dig This: The Unspeakable Writings of Terry Southern (co-editor with Nile Southern). New York: Grove Press, 2001.
 Warts and All (with Drew Friedman). New York: Penguin, 1990.
 Any Similarity to Persons Living Or Dead Is Purely Coincidental (with Drew Friedman). Agoura, CA: Fantagraphics, 1985.

Discography

Albums

Singles

Filmography
Paul Stone's unfinished adaptation of Tales of Times Square and Kevin Page's documentary on Josh Alan's life, Blacks and Jews, have played film festivals.

References

External links
  Black Cracker Online'', Josh Alan Friedman's official website

1956 births
Living people
20th-century American novelists
21st-century American novelists
American humorists
American male singer-songwriters
American rock guitarists
American blues guitarists
American male guitarists
American rock singers
American rock songwriters
Singer-songwriters from New York (state)
American male novelists
American satirists
American newspaper reporters and correspondents
Guitarists from New York (state)
20th-century American male writers
21st-century American male writers
20th-century American guitarists
Novelists from New York (state)
20th-century American non-fiction writers
21st-century American non-fiction writers
American male non-fiction writers
20th-century American male musicians